Maurice Novarina (June 28, 1907 - September 28, 2002) was a French architect; born in Thonon-les-Bains, in Haute-Savoie, he died in the town of his birth. 

He is best known for having designed the church of Notre-Dame de Toute Grâce du Plateau d'Assy.  He was a student of the École nationale supérieure des Beaux-Arts, and later became an engineer of public works.  Elected to the Académie des Beaux-Arts in 1979, he was succeeded by Aymeric Zublena in 2008.

Novarina had two sons; Patrice Novarina became an architect, while Valère Novarina is a writer.

1907 births
2002 deaths
People from Thonon-les-Bains
20th-century French architects
Members of the Académie des beaux-arts